The Samsung SPH-M540 (Samsung Rant) is a messaging phone designed and marketed by Samsung Mobile that is similar to the Samsung Gravity series.

Features

References

External links
Initial source of specs

Rant
Mobile phones introduced in 2008